The Central District of Sorkheh County is a district (bakhsh) in Sorkheh County, Semnan Province, Iran. At the 2006 census, its population was 14,194, in 4,195 families.  The District has one cities: Sorkheh. The District has two rural districts (dehestan): Hafdar Rural District and Lasgerd Rural District. It was established in 2012, along with Sorkheh County.

References 

Districts of Semnan Province
Sorkheh County
2012 establishments in Iran